Real variable may refer to:
A variable taking real values, see Function of a real variable
A free variable (archaic)
Real versus nominal value (economics)